This is the discography of Scottish band Bay City Rollers.

The British Hit Singles & Albums noted that they were "the tartan teen sensations from Edinburgh", and were "the first of many acts heralded as the 'biggest group since the Beatles' and one of the most screamed-at teeny-bopper acts of the 1970s".

During the 1970s, the Bay City Rollers achieved successes across the globe throughout Europe, Asia, Australasia and North America. The band continued touring and recording into the early 1980s with much less commercial success before going on hiatus in 1987. The band have reformed in many guises during the 1990s-present, and performed various nostalgic concerts.

The band have released various successful compilation albums including the UK top 20 hits The Very Best of in 2004 and Greatest Hits in 2010. Both albums were top 3 hits in their native Scotland.

Albums

Studio albums

Compilation albums

Live albums

Singles

References

External links
 

discography
Discographies of British artists